Maciejewo may refer to places in Poland:
Maciejewo, Gostyń County in Greater Poland Voivodeship (west-central)
Maciejewo, Koło County in Greater Poland Voivodeship (west-central)
Maciejewo, Kuyavian-Pomeranian Voivodeship (north-central)
Maciejewo, Leszno County in Greater Poland Voivodeship (west-central)
Maciejewo, Warmian-Masurian Voivodeship (north)
Maciejewo, West Pomeranian Voivodeship (north-west)